Fulwood A.F.C. was an English association football club from Sheffield, South Yorkshire. The club competed in the FA Amateur Cup during the 1920s, and won the South Yorkshire Amateur League in 1938, 1939 and 1947.

References

Defunct football clubs in England
Defunct football clubs in South Yorkshire
South Yorkshire Amateur Football League
Sheffield Amateur League
Hatchard League